Bibbenluke Shire was a local government area in the Monaro region of New South Wales, Australia.

Bibbenluke Shire was proclaimed on 7 March 1906. The shire offices were based in Bombala.

The shire was amalgamated with the Municipality of Bombala to form Bombala Shire on 1 October 1977.

References

Former local government areas of New South Wales
1906 establishments in Australia
1977 disestablishments in Australia